Wellby Super Drug was a chain of 41 drug stores that operated in Maine, New Hampshire and Vermont from 1973 until 1992. It was a wholly owned subsidiary of Hannaford Brothers, northern New England's largest grocer.

Because the Shop 'N' Saves were in the same communities as Hannaford's Wellby stores, Hannaford decided to sell the pharmacy chain.

In 1992, Wellby Super Drug was sold to Rite Aid; its successor in Maine, Walgreens, continues to operate in many of the former Wellby locations to this day.

References

External links 
Rite-Aid
Hannaford

Defunct pharmacies of the United States
Retail companies established in 1973
Retail companies disestablished in 1992
Rite Aid
Defunct companies based in Maine
Scarborough, Maine
Health care companies based in Maine